Sobinka is a town and the administrative center of Sobinsky District in Vladimir Oblast, Russia, located on the right bank of the Klyazma River (Oka's tributary),  southwest of Vladimir, the administrative center of the oblast. Population:

History
It was called Komavangard for a short period in the 1920s. It was granted town status in 1939.

Administrative and municipal status
Within the framework of administrative divisions, Sobinka serves as the administrative center of Sobinsky District, to which it is directly subordinated. As a municipal division, the town of Sobinka is incorporated within Sobinsky Municipal District as Sobinka Urban Settlement.

References

Notes

Sources

Cities and towns in Vladimir Oblast
Vladimirsky Uyezd